Brad Hudiberg is an American para-alpine skier. He represented the United States at the 1984 Winter Paralympics held in Innsbruck, Austria in alpine skiing.

He won the silver medal at the Men's Slalom LW9 event.

References 

Living people
Year of birth missing (living people)
Place of birth missing (living people)
Paralympic alpine skiers of the United States
American male alpine skiers
Alpine skiers at the 1984 Winter Paralympics
Medalists at the 1984 Winter Paralympics
Paralympic silver medalists for the United States
Paralympic medalists in alpine skiing
20th-century American people